The Donglin Temple is a Buddhist temple located in the town of Zhujing, Jinshan District, Shanghai, China. It is dedicated to Guan Yin, the bodhisattva of compassion.

History 
The temple was first constructed during the Yuan Dynasty in 1308, but has been destroyed repeatedly by war, fire, neglect, and to make way for reconstruction. The only remaining historical building on the site (a hall) was listed as a city-level protected cultural site in 1987. The temple was complete redesigned and rebuilt in the years 2004 to 2007.

Architectural layout 
As of 2010, the temple has occupied a 20-hectare site. The main entrance gate of the complex is reached via three parallel bridges.

The central feature of the temple's courtyard is a 5.4-meter-tall statue of Sudhana, the Child of Wealth, decorated with Cloisonné enamel. The statue is surrounded by 8 copper fish with opened mouth into which visitors can toss coins.

In the back of the courtyard lies, the main building of the temple, the Hall of Guanyin. The hall's exterior mimics a large red natural cliff. The entrance gate to the building is about 20 meters high and 10 meters wide. Its bronze doors are decorated with 999 relief images of Buddha. The hall is 31 meters wide, 42 meters deep, and 31 meters high and houses a gilded statue of the thousand-armed Guanyin. The statue is 27 meters tall and stands on a 2-meter-high lotus base. Its arms are up to 5 meters in length.

See also

Location 
The temple is located to in the southwest of Shanghai, on the corner of Renmin Road and Donglin Street. Its address is: No. 150 Donglin Street, Zhujing Town, Jinshan District, Shanghai.

References 

Buddhist temples in Shanghai
Yuan dynasty architecture
14th-century Buddhist temples